The Zbigniew Herbert International Literary Award (Polish: Międzynarodowa Nagroda Literacka im. Zbigniewa Herberta) is a Polish international literature prize established in 2013 in Warsaw and named after a Polish poet, essayist, and moralist Zbigniew Herbert (1924–1998). It is conferred annually by the Zbigniew Herbert Foundation and its aim is to recognize "outstanding artistic and intellectual literary achievements on the world stage which have a bearing on the world of values towards which Zbigniew Herbert’s work gravitated".

History 
In 2010, the Zbigniew Herbert Foundation was set up to preserve and promote Herbert's "creative legacy as an integral part of the literary and cultural heritage of Poland, Europe and the world" as well as to encourage and support "education in the fields of literature and the humanities, particularly modern literature, writing, poetry and journalism, with a special emphasis on programs for young people". The initiative to establish the foundation was put forward by his wife Katarzyna Dzieduszycka-Herbert.

The jury selecting the winners of the award have included many renowned literature experts and authors such as Edward Hirsch, Jaume Vallcorba Plana, Tomas Venclova, Yurii Andrukhovych, Agneta Pleijel, Michael Krüger, Lidija Dimkovska, and Jarosław Mikołajewski.

Laureates

See also 
Angelus Award
Silesius Poetry Award
Polish literature

References 

 
Polish literary awards
international literary awards